The 2011 Saskatchewan Huskies football team represented the University of Saskatchewan in the 2011 CIS university football season. They played their home games at Griffiths Stadium in Saskatoon, Saskatchewan. The team went into the season hoping to rebound from a disappointing fourth quarter collapse resulting in a loss to the Alberta Golden Bears in the 2010 Canada West Semi-Final.

Rankings

RV – Received Votes

Preseason

Schedule

The schedule is as follows:

Playoffs

Radio
All Huskies football games will be carried on CK750. The radio announcers are Darryl Skender and Kelly Bowers.

Roster

Game Notes

vs. Windsor

vs. Alberta

vs. Regina

at Manitoba

at Calgary

vs. British Columbia

vs. Calgary

at Regina

at Alberta

at UBC

Awards

2012 East West Bowl Selections

2012 CFL Draft Choices

References

Saskatchewan Huskies
Saskatchewan Huskies football seasons